High School Musical 2 is a 2007 American musical television film written by Peter Barsocchini and directed by Kenny Ortega. The 70th Disney Channel Original Movie (DCOM), it is the sequel to High School Musical (2006) and the second installment of the High School Musical film series. The film stars Zac Efron, Vanessa Hudgens, Ashley Tisdale, Lucas Grabeel, Corbin Bleu, and Monique Coleman. In High School Musical 2, Troy Bolton (Efron), Gabriella Montez (Hudgens), and the Wildcats find summer jobs at a country club, but tensions rise when Sharpay Evans (Tisdale) recruits Bolton for a talent show performance.

High School Musical 2 retained Utah as a central filming location with a return to East High School, while Entrada at Snow Canyon Country Club was used as filming location for the Evans' country club. Additional scenes were filmed in Los Angeles.

Upon the film's release on August 17, 2007, it broke a plethora of viewership records as it became the most commercially successful Disney Channel Original Movie (DCOM) ever produced. In the U.S., High School Musical 2 generated 17 million viewers in its premiere broadcast, smashing the record of its predecessor by over ten million, while the figure remains the highest the network has ever produced. It also ranked as the highest-rated basic cable telecast at the time. The film's soundtrack enjoyed widespread success; it was certified double platinum in its first week as it debuted at number one in the United States, with its lead single "What Time Is It?" reaching number six on the Billboard Hot 100. The film and soundtrack received generally positive reviews from critics and audiences, with many considering it an improvement over its predecessor. The final installment of the film series, High School Musical 3: Senior Year, was theatrically released in October 2008.

Plot
The school year ends with everyone at East High looking forward to summer vacation ("What Time Is It?"). Troy Bolton is still dating Gabriella Montez, who decides to stay in Albuquerque with her mother. Troy eventually decides to look for a summer job to gain money for college.

Sharpay and Ryan Evans plan to spend the summer at their family's country club, Lava Springs ("Fabulous"), but Sharpay's summer plans also include pursuing Troy, whom she has arranged for to be hired at the club. However, Troy convinces the club's manager Thomas Fulton into hiring Gabriella, Chad, Taylor, and the entire Wildcats basketball team. Sharpay is enraged upon learning that Gabriella is working as one of the lifeguards but is unable to get her fired, so she orders Fulton to give them difficult tasks so they would want to quit. Fulton attempts to intimidate the group but Troy rebuilds their confidence and convinces them that they can persevere ("Work This Out").

Troy continues to worry about funding for college. Sharpay senses his need and arranges for Troy to be hired as a caddy and promotes him to the University of Albuquerque's basketball team, hoping that this will convince him to sing with her at the talent show. Meanwhile, Kelsi writes a song for Troy and Gabriella and they agree to sing with their friends in the show ("You Are the Music in Me"), not knowing that Sharpay is vying for his attention and does not want the Wildcats to participate in the show. In the extended version, Sharpay and Ryan trap Troy as he prepares for a date with Gabriella by rehearsing their song ("Humuhumunukunukuapua'a"), much to Troy's annoyance.

Ryan realizes he does not mean much to Sharpay anymore, as she is ready to blow her brother aside for the opportunity to perform with Troy. This leads to tensions between the siblings, and Ryan angrily informs Sharpay that he will no longer obey her orders. Taylor and Gabriella invite Ryan to a staff baseball game, where he persuades the Wildcats to take part in the talent show ("I Don't Dance").

Troy and Gabriella's relationship is strained when Troy sees Ryan with Gabriella, sparking jealousy. Chad expresses disappointment at Troy for abandoning his friends after being promoted by Sharpay; this also created animosity between Troy and the Wildcats. Owing to a "promise" from Troy, Sharpay rehearse another song for the talent show with him ("You Are the Music in Me (Sharpay Version)").

When Sharpay discovers that Ryan and the Wildcats are putting together their own performance in the show, she orders Fulton to ban all staff members from performing. Gabriella confronts Sharpay about her interference and quits from Lava Springs. Troy overhears their conversation and tries to persuade Gabriella to change her mind. Gabriella expresses her loss of trust with Troy ("Gotta Go My Own Way"), leaves Lava Springs, and returns her necklace, which he had given to her after school ended. At home, Troy explains to his father about the situation, and begins to regret his actions.

Troy returns to work the next day to find that his friends still refuse to talk to him, while Kelsi silently shows Troy the notice from Fulton, causing Troy to question his own motivations ("Bet on It") and learns that Sharpay has been manipulating him. Troy informs Sharpay that he will not sing with her, and reconciles with the Wildcats. They convince him to perform, which he does only under the condition that they are all allowed to perform as well.

At Sharpay's supposed instruction, Ryan gives Troy a new song to learn moments before the show. As Troy goes onstage, he asks Sharpay why she switched the song, and Sharpay is shocked to find that her brother tricked her. Troy performs the song ("Everyday") and reunites with Gabriella as the Wildcats joins them onstage, while Sharpay presents Ryan with the award for the talent show. After the talent show, the Wildcats go to the golf course to enjoy the fireworks ("You Are the Music In Me (Reprise)") and everyone in Lava Springs celebrates the end of summer with a pool party the next day ("All for One").

Cast

 Troy Bolton (Zac Efron), Gabriella's boyfriend, the most popular male student at East High School and the captain of the varsity basketball team. For this movie, Efron did all of his own singing, whereas, in the first High School Musical, his singing was blended with singer Drew Seeley's voice.
 Gabriella Montez (Vanessa Hudgens), Troy's girlfriend. She is the lifeguard at the Lava Springs Country Club until Sharpay's actions cause her to quit and break up with Troy.
 Sharpay Evans (Ashley Tisdale), Ryan's twin sister, who is determined to win the talent show while also vying for Troy's attention.
 Ryan Evans (Lucas Grabeel), Sharpay's twin brother.
 Chad Danforth (Corbin Bleu), Troy's best friend.
 Taylor McKessie (Monique Coleman), Gabriella's best friend. She is also friends with Kelsi Nielsen and Martha Cox and is dating Chad. She is captain of the school Scholastic Decathlon team. She has a summer job at Lava Springs as an Activities Coordinator.
 Thomas Fulton (Mark L. Taylor), the manager of Lava Springs.
 Coach Jack Bolton (Bart Johnson), Troy's father and East High's basketball coach.
 Darby Evans (Jessica Tuck), Sharpay and Ryan's mother and president of the Lava Springs Board.
 Vance Evans (Robert Curtis Brown), Sharpay and Ryan's father.
 Ms. Darbus (Alyson Reed), East High's drama teacher.
 Zeke Baylor (Chris Warren Jr.), a friend of Troy and Chad and plays for the basketball team.
 Jason Cross (Ryne Sanborn), a friend of Troy, Chad, and Zeke and plays on the basketball team.
 Kelsi Nielsen (Olesya Rulin), a friend of Gabriella and Taylor and a pianist and composer.
 Martha Cox (Kaycee Stroh), a friend of Gabriella, Kelsi, and Taylor.
 Jackie (Tanya Chisholm), one of Sharpay's friends (a.k.a. The Sharpettes).
 Lucille Bolton (Leslie Wing Pomeroy), Troy's mother.
 Lea (Kelli Baker), a Sharpette.
 Emma (McCall Clark), a Sharpette.
 Unnamed Wildcats players (Shane Harper and Charles Klapow), appearing as background dancers. 
Miley Cyrus makes a cameo appearance as a dancer at the end of the film.

Release
The premiere of High School Musical 2 aired at 8 PM Eastern Time on August 17, 2007, and included a telecast hosted by Kenny Ortega and the movie's cast. On Saturday, August 18, Disney Channel aired "High School Musical 2: Wildcat Chat", in which the stars of the movie answered questions posed by fans. On August 19, Disney aired a sing-along version of the movie. On May 23, DirecTV announced that they would be hosting an exclusive high-definition airing of the movie a few days after the August 17 premiere on its network-only channel, The 101.

Disney Channel aired a weekly program called Road to High School Musical 2, beginning on June 8, 2007, and leading up to the premiere of High School Musical 2 in August. The show offered viewers a behind-the-scenes look into the production of the movie. The world premiere of the opening number "What Time Is It" was on Radio Disney May 25, 2007, and similarly "You Are The Music In Me" premiered on July 13, 2007.

On December 11, 2007, the movie was released on DVD and Blu-ray titled High School Musical 2: Extended Edition. On September 15, 2008, a 2-disc special edition of the movie was released titled High School Musical 2: Deluxe Dance Edition.

Songs

Reception

Viewership 

The first broadcast of the film on August 17, 2007, broke records, receiving 17.2 million viewers. This number made it, at the time, the most-watched basic-cable telecast in history (the previous record was held by an edition of ESPN's Monday Night Football between the New York Giants and the Dallas Cowboys on October 23, 2006, which attracted 16 million viewers), the most-watched made-for-cable movie ever (the previous record was held by TNT's January 21, 2001, airing of Crossfire Trail, which brought in 12.5 million viewers), and the largest audience of any program on broadcast or cable in the 2007 summer television season, along with Friday nights for the past five years. Ratings for the second showing of the movie fell to 8.4 million, and the third showing fell to 7.4 million, totaling the premiere weekend to 33.04 million viewers. Following the movie's airing, a preview of the new Disney Channel show Phineas and Ferb aired, which starred Tisdale.

In Latin America, the premiere of High School Musical 2 was seen by 3.3 million viewers in the north region. The film was the most-watched in its schedule, among all cable channels, and produced the highest rating of the channel, surpassing all original films of Disney Channel. Among other records, the premiere in Argentina surpassed the debut of High School Musical the last year, in a 107 percent, while in Brazil the sequel reached 208 percent, and Mexico did so with 61 percent. In the United Kingdom, the movie became Disney Channel UK's most viewed program ever, totaling 1.2 million viewers in its first showing.

Critical response 
On Rotten Tomatoes the film has an approval rating of 83% based on 23 reviews, with an average rating of 5.8/10. The website's critics consensus reads, "Surprisingly better than its predecessor, High School Musical 2 returns to enchant tweens with its snappy songs, wicked dance moves, and peppy spirit." Metacritic assigned the film a weighted average score of 72 out of 100, based on 23 critics, indicating "generally favorable reviews".

USA Today'''s Robert Bianco awarded the film three stars out of four, saying High School Musical 2 was "sweet, smart, bursting with talent and energy, and awash in innocence". While critics enjoyed the film, they noted that the timing of the movie's premiere seemed odd, premiering just when school was about to start up again, while the movie's plot involved the gang going on summer vacation. High School Musical 2 won the "So Hot Right Now" award at the Nickelodeon Australian Kids' Choice Awards 2007, in which High School Musical castmate Zac Efron hosted with The Veronicas.

Stage adaptation

Like its predecessor, High School Musical 2'' has been adapted into two different theatrical productions: a one-act, 70-minute version and a two-act full-length production. This stage production includes the song "Hummuhummunukunukuapua'a" that was left out of the original movie but included in the DVD. Through Music Theater International, Disney Theatrical began licensing the theatrical rights in October 2008. MTI had originally recruited 7 schools to serve as tests for the new full-length adaptation, but due to complications with multiple drafts of both the script and the score, all but two schools were forced to drop out of the pilot program.

 On May 18, 2008, Woodlands High School became the first school to produce High School Musical 2.
 From July 17–August 3, 2008, Harrell Theatre, in Collierville, Tennessee, was the first community theatre to perform the production, which featured both a senior cast and a junior cast.
 From January 15–February 15, 2009, the West Coast premiere production was presented by Pacific Repertory Theatre's School of Dramatic Arts. The production was directed by PacRep founder Stephen Moorer, who previously directed the California premiere of the first High School Musical.
 From April 6–18, 2009, the UK Premiere was performed by StageDaze Theatre Company in Cardiff.

Awards

References

External links

 
 
 
 Disneychannel-asia.com, Official Asia site.
 Adisney.go.com, Official Aggregate site

High School Musical films
2000s high school films
2007 television films
2007 films
American children's comedy films
2000s musical comedy films
Films directed by Kenny Ortega
Films shot in Salt Lake City
Films set in New Mexico
Television sequel films
American teen musical films
2000s English-language films
2000s American films